Junín Municipality is a municipality in Táchira State, Venezuela.

Municipalities of Táchira